Leicester Forest West is a hamlet and civil parish in the Blaby district of Leicestershire, England.  It has a population of about 30, making it much smaller than its neighbour, Leicester Forest East. The village takes its name from the ancient Leicester Forest.

Hamlets in Leicestershire
Civil parishes in Leicestershire
Blaby